Vladimír Hriňák (25 February 1964 – 25 July 2012) was a Slovak football referee. He took up refereeing in 1982, and was promoted to the Czechoslovak First League for the 1992–93 season. In 1993, he became a FIFA-listed match official, and in a 16-year international career, he refereed over 100 UEFA matches. In 2008, Hriňák was selected as the fourth official for the Champions League final between Manchester United and Chelsea, as part of an all-Slovak team headed by Ľuboš Micheľ. Hriňák's final international fixture was a match between Villarreal and Red Bull Salzburg in the group stage of the 2009–10 Europa League on 17 December 2009.

After retiring from refereeing, Hriňák took up several positions within the Slovak Football Association and was also the chairman of the Bratislava Football Association referees committee.

References

External links
Profile at WorldReferee.com

1964 births
2012 deaths
Slovak football referees